Dovarjin (also Romanized as Dovarjīn, Doorjin, and Dūrjīn; also known as Lamājīn) is a village in Vilkij-e Markazi Rural District, Vilkij District, Namin County, Ardabil Province, Iran. At the 2006 census, its population was 232, in 46 families.

References 

Towns and villages in Namin County